Kvikne is a former municipality that was part of the old Hedmark county, Norway. The  municipality of Kvikne existed from 1838 until its dissolution in 1966 when it was split between the present-day municipalities of Tynset (in what is now Innlandet county) and Rennebu (in what is now Trøndelag county). The administrative centre of the municipality was the village of Kvikne where Kvikne Church is located.

Copper mining and soapstone quarries were historically significant industries in the municipality.

Name
The Old Norse form of the name was (probably)  which means "living", possibly referring to the quick clay in the area.

Churches
The Church of Norway had two parishes within the municipality of Kvikne. It was part of the Nord-Østerdal prosti (deanery) in the Diocese of Hamar.

History
Kvikne was established as a municipality on 1 January 1838 (see formannskapsdistrikt law). During the 1960s, there were many municipal mergers across Norway due to the work of the Schei Committee. The municipality of Kvikne was dissolved on 1 January 1966 and its lands were divided into two. The  Kvikne parish in the south (population: 664) was merged into Tynset Municipality in Hedmark county and the  Innset parish in the north (population: 420) was incorporated into Rennebu Municipality in Sør-Trøndelag county. A few years later in 1970, the border was adjusted again with the Garlia farm (population: 5) being transferred from Tynset to Rennebu.

Government
All municipalities in Norway, including Kvikne, are responsible for primary education (through 10th grade), outpatient health services, senior citizen services, unemployment and other social services, zoning, economic development, and municipal roads. The municipality was governed by a municipal council of elected representatives, which in turn elected a mayor.

Municipal council
The municipal council  of Kvikne was made up of representatives that were elected to four year terms.  The party breakdown of the final municipal council was as follows:

Climate

See also
List of former municipalities of Norway

References

Tynset
Rennebu
Former municipalities of Norway
1838 establishments in Norway
1966 disestablishments in Norway